Roy Lorenson is a footballer who played as a centre half in the Football League for Tranmere Rovers.

References

1932 births
Living people
Footballers from Liverpool
Association football central defenders
English footballers
Halifax Town A.F.C. players
Tranmere Rovers F.C. players
English Football League players
Tranmere Rovers F.C. non-playing staff
Sabah F.C. (Malaysia) managers